Tham Phra Wang Daeng, also known as the Cave of the Monk, is a deep cave located in Thung Salaeng Luang National Park, Amphoe Noen Maprang, Phitsanulok Province, upper central Thailand. It is the longest cave in Thailand, the distance is about 13 kilometers. Buddhist statues and relics, carvings and reliefs, a subterranean river, multiple bat colonies, and a trove of speleothems populate the cave. In 2003, a biological expedition to the cave resulted in the discovery of new fish species, including discoveries in the Balitoridae and Cyprinidae families.

See also 
 List of caves
 Speleology

References

Caves of Thailand
Geography of Phitsanulok province